Noureddine Bekkouche (born 1947) is an Algerian weightlifter. He competed in the men's featherweight event at the 1984 Summer Olympics.

References

External links
 

1947 births
Living people
Algerian male weightlifters
Olympic weightlifters of Algeria
Weightlifters at the 1984 Summer Olympics
Place of birth missing (living people)
20th-century Algerian people